The dollar was the currency of Nova Scotia between 1860 and 1871. It replaced the Nova Scotian pound at a rate of 5 dollars = 1 pound (1 dollar = 4 shillings) and was consequently worth less than the Canadian dollar (worth 4s 1.3d). The Nova Scotian dollar was replaced by the Canadian dollar at a rate of 73 Canadian cents = 75 Nova Scotian cents, thus maintaining the difference between the two currencies established in 1860.

Coins

Between 1861 and 1864, bronze ½ and 1 cent coins were issued. These were the only coins issued for the Nova Scotian dollar. A half-cent coin was required because British six-pence coins in circulation were valued at 12½ Nova Scotian cents.

Banknotes
Between 1861 and 1866, the Provincial Government introduced Treasury notes for 5 dollars. In addition, three chartered banks issued paper money in Nova Scotia, the Bank of Nova Scotia, the Halifax Banking Company and the Merchants Bank of Halifax. The private banks all issued notes in a single denomination, 20 dollars. They later issued notes in Canadian dollars.

The Province of Canada issued notes dated 1866 overprinted with "Payable in Halifax / only". These were for circulation in Nova Scotia as local currency. Notes for 5 dollars were issued, worth $4.86 in Canadian currency.

References

External links
 

 

Currencies of Canada
Modern obsolete currencies
1860 establishments in Nova Scotia
1871 disestablishments in Canada
Economy of Nova Scotia
19th century in Nova Scotia
19th-century economic history
1860 establishments in Canada